Juan José is a Mexican telenovela produced by Televisa for Telesistema Mexicano in 1964.

Cast 
Maricruz Olivier
Narciso Busquets
Raúl Padilla
Antonio Medellín

References

External links 

Mexican telenovelas
1964 telenovelas
Televisa telenovelas
1964 Mexican television series debuts
1965 Mexican television series endings
Spanish-language telenovelas